The 2003–04 Georgian Cup (also known as the David Kipiani Cup) was the sixtieth season overall and fourteenth since independence of the Georgian annual football tournament. The competition began on 27 February 2004 and ended with the Final held on 26 May 2004. The defending champions are Dinamo Tbilisi.

Round of 32 
The first legs were played on 27 and 28 February and the second legs were played on 1 and 2 March 2004.

|}

Round of 16 
The first legs were played on 6, 7 and 10 March and the second legs were played on 12, 13 and 14 March 2004.

|}

Quarterfinals 
The matches were played on 22 March (first legs) and 6 April 2004 (second legs).

|}

Semifinals 
The matches were played on 20 April (first legs) and 5 May 2004 (second legs).

|}

Final

See also 
 2003–04 Umaglesi Liga
 2003–04 Pirveli Liga

References

External links 
 The Rec.Sport.Soccer Statistics Foundation.
 es.geofootball.com  

Georgian Cup seasons
Cup
Georgian Cup, 2004-05